Archer's ground robin (Cossypha archeri) or Archer's robin-chat, is a species of bird in the family Muscicapidae.
It is found in the Albertine Rift montane forests.

The bird's common name commemorates the British explorer and colonial official Sir Geoffrey Francis Archer.

References

Archer's ground robin
Archer's ground robin
Taxonomy articles created by Polbot
Taxobox binomials not recognized by IUCN